Klára Seidlová (born 10 March 1994) is a Czech sprinter. She won a bronze medal at the 2013 European Junior Championships. She also represented her country at the 2018 World Indoor Championships reaching the semifinals.

International competitions

Personal bests
Outdoor
100 metres – 11.54 (+1.8 m/s, Zeulenroda 2017)
200 metres – 23.66 (-0.1 m/s, Třinec 2017)
Indoor
60 metres – 7.23 (Prague 2018)
200 metres – 24.42 (Prague 2017)

References

1994 births
Living people
Czech female sprinters
Czech Athletics Championships winners